Balkansko a naše (roughly translated as From the Balkans, But Ours) is the fourth solo, studio album by Bosnian rapper Edo Maajka, released on 25 March 2008. When asked what the album will be like, Maajka said that he wanted to do a retro album to remember 1990s hip hop in Bosnia and Croatia.

The whole album was produced by Koolade, except for "Daj Mi Ljubav" ("Give Me Love"), which was produced by DJ Knowhow. The first official single, "Pokradi Lovu" ("Steal Money"), was released as a promotional single by Fmjam on their official web-site. The second single is "Gansi". The third single is Svi su ošli na more. The fourth single is "Sve prolazi" with a music video.

Track listing

References

External links
http://www.bosnjaci.net/prilog.php?pid=23383
https://web.archive.org/web/20111003105036/http://www.dezinformator.com/estrada-folk-show-grand-show/edo-maajka-balkansko-a-nase-5.html
https://archive.today/20070620024100/http://www.novosti.ba/koktel/382.html
https://web.archive.org/web/20080404144346/http://www.vecernji.hr/home/showbiz/3018401/index.do;jsessionid=48F899A28FF8CF6B01F23A068D1E0A65.2
http://www.brcanskaraja.net/index.php?option=com_content&task=view&id=371&pop=1&page=0&Itemid=1
https://web.archive.org/web/20080313153234/http://www.dnevniavaz.ba/showbiz/estrada/zbog-novog-albuma-nije-stigao-u-vinkovce
http://www.jutarnji.hr/kultura_i_zivot/glazba/clanak/art-2008,3,20,,113063.jl

2008 albums
Edo Maajka albums